The 2000 Scotland rugby union tour of New Zealand was a series of matches played in June–July 2000 in New Zealand by Scotland national rugby union team.

Results 
'Scores and results list Scotland's points tally first.

Scotland
tour
Scotland national rugby union team tours
tour
Rugby union tours of New Zealand
Scottish-New Zealand culture